Yulia Dmitriyevna Tikhonova (born 8 April 1986) is a Belarusian cross-country skier who competes internationally.

She competed for Belarus at the FIS Nordic World Ski Championships 2017 in Lahti, Finland.

References 

1986 births
Living people
Belarusian people of Russian descent
Belarusian female cross-country skiers
Tour de Ski skiers
Cross-country skiers at the 2018 Winter Olympics
Olympic cross-country skiers of Belarus